The following is a list of New Zealand women's national rugby union team international matches.

Legend

Overall 
New Zealand's overall international match record against all nations, updated to 27 August 2022, is as follows:

See Women's international rugby for information about the status of international games and match numbering.

Full Internationals

1990s

2000s

2010s

2020s

Other internationals

Notes

References

External links 

 Black Ferns Test Match Record

New Zealand women's national rugby union team
Women's rugby union in New Zealand